Zach Iscol (born August 18, 1978) is an American civil servant, non-profit executive, politician, and armed forces veteran who serves as Commissioner of New York City Emergency Management. Iscol is a United States Marine veteran and was a Democratic candidate in the 2021 New York City Comptroller election.

Early life and education
Iscol was born in New York City, New York and grew up in Pound Ridge, New York, in wealth and privilege. He is Jewish. His father is a cellphone technology entrepreneur, and his mother is an educator.

He graduated Phillips Exeter Academy in 1997. He graduated Cornell University in 2001 with a major in government and competed in lightweight football.

Career

Military service
Iscol served two tours and fought in Iraq from 2001 to 2007 as a Captain in the U.S. Marine Corps, 3rd Battalion, 1st Marines. After returning from Iraq, he successfully lobbied to bring his threatened Iraqi translator to the United States.

He returned to Iraq to make a film, The Western Front, which was shown at the 2010 Tribeca Film Festival, and explored in what ways the US changed its tactics in Iraq over time. Iscol served as screenwriter, cast, director, and producer.

Private sector 
Iscol launched the Headstrong Project in 2012. It is a New York City-based nonprofit organization that provides veterans and their families in 25 cities with free mental health care.

Iscol co-founded Task & Purpose in 2014. It is a military-focused digital media company. Its parent company is Grid North Group. In 2018 managing editor Adam Weinstein resigned after CEO Zachary Iscol requested that he change the title of a ProPublica investigation into undue influence over the Department of Veterans Affairs featured on the site. Weinstein contended that Iscol strongly disagreed with both the title and the factual accuracy of the reporting done by ProPublica which Weinstein felt was undue influence on the publication's editorial independence. Weinstein also said that this was not the first time that management, specifically Iscol, had interfered in the editorial process in an effort to make the publication appealing to more conservative readers.

In 2014 Iscol also founded and became CEO of Hirepurpose, a hiring platform job website for military veterans and relatives.

Political career; mayoral and comptroller campaigns
Iscol served as a Deputy Director of a temporary field hospital in the Javits Center during the COVID-19 pandemic in New York City in the spring of 2020.

Iscol was one of a number of candidates looking to succeed New York City mayor Bill de Blasio. He launched his campaign in the 2021 New York City Democratic mayoral primary on October 21, 2020, and was initially entered in the June 22, 2021, Democratic primary. Iscol's campaign staff included Joe Trippi, a national political strategist. As of mid-January 2021, he had raised more than $746,000 from donors, spent just over $261,000 on his campaign, and had about $485,000 left.

On January 26, 2021, Iscol filed paperwork to drop out of the mayor’s race, and run instead in the 2021 New York City Comptroller election. As of the end of January, he was the second-biggest fundraiser in the race. Iscol said his goal was to help the city recover economically from the pandemic, focusing on the performance of city agencies. He also said he would require companies that contract with New York City to describe their commitment to the five boroughs and that he would push to reinvest some pension fund monies in local job creation. Candidates who raised at least $125,000 from at least 500 donors qualified for matching city funds from the New York City Campaign Finance Board, on an 8-to-1 match basis.  As of February 16, 2021, he was one of three candidates who had qualified for matching funds, along with Brian Benjamin and Brad Lander.

New York City Emergency Management 
On February 17, 2022, Iscol was appointed commissioner of New York City Emergency Management by Mayor Eric Adams.

References

External links
zachiscol.com
"Zach Iscol, Veteran And Entrepreneur, Joins NYC Mayor’s Race," Hamodia, October 21, 2020.
"Meet the Mayoral Candidate: Zach Iscol," The Brian Lehrer Show, WNYC, January 19, 2021 (video)
"Decision NYC: Zach Iscol Discusses His Campaign," Gotham Gazette, February 1, 2021  (video)

1978 births
Living people
New York (state) Democrats
Candidates in the 2021 United States elections
Writers from Manhattan
Phillips Exeter Academy alumni
Military personnel from New York City
United States Marine Corps personnel of the Iraq War
21st-century American screenwriters
American documentary film producers
21st-century American politicians
People from Pound Ridge, New York
Cornell University alumni
United States Marine Corps officers
American documentary film directors
American nonprofit chief executives
Jewish American people in New York (state) politics
Jewish American military personnel
New York City Emergency Management